The World Figure Skating Championships is an annual figure skating competition sanctioned by the International Skating Union in which figure skaters compete for the title of World Champion.

Men's competitions took place from February 12 to 13 in Vienna, Austria. Ladies' and pairs' competitions took place from March 1 to 2 also in London, United Kingdom.

Results

Men

Judges:
 Mr. Arnold Huber 
 Mr. Rudolf Kaler 
 Ms. B. Pavliska 
 Mr. Fritz Schober 
 Mr. Andor Czende

Ladies

Judges:
 August Anderberg 
 Herbert J. Clarke 
 Kurt Dannenberg 
 Fritz Kachler 
 Charles Sabouret 
 Andor Szende 
 K. Skulicz

Pairs

Judges:
 E. Bonfiglio 
 Kurt Dannenberg 
 H. Grünauer 
 John F. Page 
 K. Skulicz 
 Josef Slíva 
 Andor Szende

Sources
 Result List provided by the ISU
 newspaper Berliner Tageblatt, 4 March 1937

World Figure Skating Championships
World Figure Skating Championships
International figure skating competitions hosted by Austria
International figure skating competitions hosted by the United Kingdom
1930s in Vienna
World Figure Skating Championships
World Figure Skating Championships
Sports competitions in London
Sports competitions in Vienna